Tomasz Wietecha (born 6 March 1978) is a Polish footballer and former goalkeeper coach who plays as a goalkeeper for the III liga, group IV club Stal Stalowa Wola.

Club career
Wietecha started his career with Stal Stalowa Wola. In 2000, he joined Pogoń Staszów, with which he reached the third round of the Polish Cup. After the 2000-01 season, he returned to Stalowa Wola. In 2016, he joined the fourth league side Sokół Nisko. In 2019, he became the goalkeeper coach of Stal Stalowa Wola, since after the club's relegation to the third league, he resumed his football career and joined the club in March 2021.

Appointed for the Stal Stalowa Wola team manager in February 2023.

References

External links
 
 

1978 births
Living people
People from Stalowa Wola
Polish footballers
Polish football managers
Association football goalkeepers
Stal Stalowa Wola players
Stal Rzeszów players
Sokół Nisko players
I liga players
II liga players
III liga players
IV liga players